Inn for Trouble is a 1960 black and white British comedy film intended as a low budget filler to support a main feature in the days of cinema double features. it was a spin-off of the 1950s sitcom The Larkins - starring Peggy Mount, David Kossoff and Leslie Phillips; the title makes allusion to the real Trouble House Inn in Gloucestershire near Tetbury.

Plot

The Larkin family takes over a run-down country public house, "The Earl Osbourne". The pub has a resident young French artist, Yvette.

Meanwhile a property developer wants to buy the pub to knock it down to build a brand new "roadhouse" instead. He sends his nephew Percy to investigate.

Their efforts to rejuvenate business are impeded by the long-standing tradition of free beer being distributed by the local Earl. They try to trick people in with the same promise of free beer.

Meanwhile Percy Pirbright continually tries to catch the pub out by dragging the local policeman along to observe alleged breaches of the law (all without success).

A natural spring erupts in the cellar causing a flooding problem. However, they are finally offered £20,000 for the pub (which was very generous) and they also sell the formula for their own beer: the secret ingredient being the spring water.

Trivia

The film is notable for the final credited appearance of Graham Moffatt in the role of Jumbo and the final appearance of A. E. Matthews as Sir Hector Gore-Blandish.

Cast
 Peggy Mount as Ada Larkin
 David Kossoff as Alf Larkin
 Leslie Phillips as John Belcher
 Glyn Owen as Lord Bill Osborne
 Yvonne Monlaur as Yvette Dupres
 A. E. Matthews as Sir Hector Gore-Blandish
 Ronan O'Casey as Jeff Rogers
 Shaun O'Riordan as Eddie Larkin
 Alan Wheatley as Harold Gaskin
 Willoughby Goddard as Sergeant Saunders
 Alan Rolfe as Ted
 Gerald Campion as George
 Stanley Unwin as Farmer
 Irene Handl as Lily
 Graham Moffatt as Jumbo Gudge
 Charles Hawtrey as Silas Withering
 Esma Cannon as Dolly
 Edward Malin as Old Charlie
 Barbara Mitchell as Hetty Prout
 Graham Stark as Charlie
 Frank Williams as Percy Pirbright

Reception
Kine Weekly called it and The Same to You the most popular British double bill at the British box office in 1960.

References

External links
 

1960 films
1960 comedy films
British comedy films
Films based on television series
Films directed by C. M. Pennington-Richards
1960s English-language films
1960s British films